Charley Scales is a former professional American football player who played running back for seven seasons for the Pittsburgh Steelers, Cleveland Browns, and Atlanta Falcons. His final season was played in the CFL with the Montreal Alouettes, for which he played 13 games, gaining 370 yards on 101 carries, with 2 touchdowns.

Professional career

Pittsburgh Steelers
A Pittsburgh native, Scales played his first two NFL seasons with the Steelers, signing with the team as a free agent. As a backup to fullback John Henry Johnson, Scales carried the ball 26 times for 81 yards in 1960 and 50 times for 184 yards in 1961. He did not score a touchdown as a member of the Steelers.

Cleveland Browns
Scales was traded to Cleveland prior to the 1962 exhibition season for one of Cleveland's two 1963 fifth round draft picks (the Browns had acquired a second fifth round pick in a trade with Detroit). Scales was acquired, according to Browns head coach Paul Brown, to compete with Preston Powell as a backup fullback to Jim Brown. Coach Brown said that Scales had "bothered" the Browns in exhibition games. That, plus the fact that the Steelers had selected fullback Bob Ferguson in the first round of the 1962 NFL Draft, thus making Scales expendable, prompted the trade.

In four seasons with the Browns, Scales rushed for 338 yards, scoring four touchdowns. He caught 10 passes for 97 yards.

Scales was traded to the expansion Atlanta Falcons on August 23, 1966 for a draft choice. He scored two touchdowns against Atlanta in an exhibition game just a few days prior to the trade.

References

Montreal Alouettes players
1938 births
American football running backs
Pittsburgh Steelers players
Atlanta Falcons players
Cleveland Browns players
Indiana Hoosiers football players
Living people